Puerto Rico Highway 735 (PR-735) is a rural road located between the municipalities of Cayey and Cidra, Puerto Rico, and it corresponds to an original segment of the historic Carretera Central. The Arenas and La Liendre old bridges are located on this route.

Major intersections

See also

 List of highways numbered 735

References

External links
 

735